Edmund Fortescue may refer to:
 Edmund Fortescue (died 1624) (1560–1624)
 Edmund Fortescue (died 1647) (1610–1647)
 Sir Edmund Fortescue, 1st Baronet (1642–1666)